Founded in 2001, Jeonju International Sori Festival (전주세계소리축제) is South Korea's main event for traditional music and, since 2011, world music. In 2012, 2013, and 2014, Songlines listed Jeonju Sori Festival among the World's Best 25 International Festivals, the only Asian festival in the list.

History and editions
About the 8 first editions:

 Commissioners: Chun Idoo (2001–2003), Ahn Sook-sun (2004–2008), Kim Myung-gon (2009–2010), Park Kolleen and Kim Hyeongseok (2011–2013), Park Jechun (2014–present)

Events and program

The Jeonju Int'l Sori Festival is held every fall in the Sori Arts Center of Jeollabuk-do and various venues in Jeollabuk-do, with indoor and outdoor programs, Sori Festival for Kids, Master Classes of Masters and Master Sori Artists, and other workshops. All the great masters of gugak (Korean traditional music, for instance pansori and pungmul) perform in a festival that welcomes artists from all over the world.

See also

List of music festivals in South Korea
List of folk festivals

References

External links
Official website: sorifestival.com (in Korean, English, Chinese, Japanese).

Music festivals in South Korea
Jeonju
Korean traditional music
Folk festivals in South Korea
World music festivals
Annual events in South Korea
Music festivals established in 2001
Autumn events in South Korea